Two-time defending champion Rafael Nadal defeated Guillermo Cañas in the final, 6–3, 6–4 to win the singles tennis title at the 2007 Barcelona Open.

Seeds

Draw

Key
WC - Wildcard
Q - Qualifier
LL - Lucky loser

Finals

Earlier rounds

Section 1

Section 2

Section 3

Section 4

External links
 Singles draw
 Singles qualification draw

References

Singles